The  is a stable of sumo wrestlers, part of the Tokitsukaze ichimon or group of stables. It was established in its modern incarnation on 1 October 1998 by former maegashira Daishōyama, who is the stable's current head coach. As of January 2023, it had 18 wrestlers, of which seven were sekitori. Eight wrestlers in the stable's history have reached the top makuuchi division as of 2019.

In December 2016 the stable moved from the Isegahama ichimon to the Tokitsukaze ichimon.

Ring name conventions
Many wrestlers at this stable take ring names or shikona that begin with the characters 大翔 (read: daishō) or simply 大 (read: dai), in deference to their coach and the stable's owner, the former Daishōyama.

Owner
1998-present: 11th Oitekaze (iin, former maegashira Daishōyama)

Notable active wrestlers

Daiamami (best rank maegashira)
Daieishō (best rank sekiwake)
Daishoho (best rank maegashira)
Daishōmaru (best rank maegashira)
Endō (best rank komusubi)
Tobizaru (best rank komusubi)
Tsurugishō (best rank maegashira)

Coach
None

Notable former members
Hayateumi (former sekiwake)
Kokkai (former komusubi)
Hamanishiki (former maegashira)

Referee
Shikimori Kiichirō (Makuuchi gyōji, real name Osamu Wachi)

Hairdressers
Tokosaku (2nd class tokoyama)
Tokokaze (4th class tokoyama)

Location and access
Saitama prefecture, Sōka City, Sezaki 5-32-22
15 minute walk from Yatsuka Station on Tōbu Isesaki Line

See also
List of sumo stables
List of active sumo wrestlers
List of past sumo wrestlers
Glossary of sumo terms

References

External links
Official site 
Oitekaze stable at the Japan Sumo Association

Active sumo stables